Wetheral Priory Gatehouse is a 15th-century stone fortification in Wetheral, Cumbria. The priory was founded at the start of the 12th century and the gatehouse controlled the entrance to its outer courtyard. When the priory was dissolved in 1538 the gatehouse and a nearby stretch of wall were the only parts to survive. The gatehouse passed into the control of Carlisle Cathedral and became the local vicarage during the 16th and 17th centuries, before being used to store hay. Now part of a modern farm that occupies the former priory site, it is controlled by English Heritage and open to visitors. The crenellated gatehouse has three storeys, with the main entrance and porters' lodge on the ground floor and two domestic chambers on the upper floors. English Heritage considers the building to be "the finest medieval gatehouse in Cumbria".

History

Wetheral Priory Gatehouse was probably built in the 15th century and formed the entrance to the priory's outer courtyard. Wetheral Priory was a small Benedictine institution, founded by Ranulf le Meschin following the Norman invasion of Cumbria at the beginning of the 12th century. The motherhouse of the priory was St Mary's Abbey in York. The priory was known for a special right of sanctuary for criminals that had been granted to it by Henry I, allowing the priory to shelter felons who could reach the church and ring the bell there.

The gatehouse originally formed part of a range of buildings running along the side of the outer courtyard, and would have controlled access to the institution, as well as symbolising its power and status. The Anglo-Scottish border was also still dangerous in the 15th century, and many monasteries in the area, like Wetheral, had protective fortifications.

By the 16th century, the priory was in decline, but its closure came as a result of the dissolution of the monasteries in England and Wales under Henry VIII. To help speed the process of closing the institution, Ralf Hartley was appointed as the prior of Wetheral by Henry's minister, Thomas Cromwell; royal commissioners visited in 1536, and the priory was finally surrendered to the Crown in 1538. The priory's belongings were sold off or taken by Henry, depending on their value, but the lands were given to Carlisle Cathedral. Although the rest of the priory soon fell into disrepair, the gatehouse became the local vicarage; it was still intact and in use by the minister in 1687.

The gatehouse was later used as a hayloft. In 1978 it passed into the guardianship of the state, and is now in the care of English Heritage and open to the public. Still well preserved, it is protected under UK law as a Grade I listed building.

Architecture

English Heritage considers the building to be "the finest medieval gatehouse in Cumbria". It closely resembles the larger fortifications at Thornton and Tynemouth abbeys, forming a three-storey building built of coursed red sandstone, and now stands on the edge of the modern Wetheral Priory Farm, which occupies the site of the original priory. The marks of the range of buildings that once ran alongside the gatehouse can be seen on the external walls, and the gatehouse is topped by battlements.

The ground floor includes a barrel vaulted entrance passageway and a porters' lodge, the latter  in size. They had fireplaces, garderobes and small bed chambers in the walls. The roof is predominantly built of timbers dating from between 1512 and 1536; the current structure was probably built around 1540, possibly when the building was converted for use as a vicarage.

This medieval wall had four windows running along it, with a staircase at one end.

See also

Grade I listed buildings in Cumbria
Listed buildings in Wetheral

References

Bibliography

External links

English Heritage visitor's information

English Heritage sites in Cumbria
Buildings and structures in Cumbria
Grade I listed buildings in Cumbria
Monasteries in Cumbria
Christian monasteries established in the 12th century
Gates in England
Gatehouses (architecture)
Wetheral